Callejon (Spanish callejón "alley", [ka.ʎeˈxon]) is a German metalcore band founded in Düsseldorf in 2002. The band writes and sings the majority of their lyrics in German.

History 
Callejon was founded in 2002. Their first release was a self-titled demo released in 2003. On 7 May 2005, the band released their EP Chronos. Their debut album, Willkommen im Beerdigungscafé, was released on 7 July 2006. Both albums were released through their label My Favorite Toy Records, which is based in Mainz.

In February 2003, the band went on a three-weeks promotional tour for their album Willkommen im Beerdigungscafé.

In September 2007, they signed a contract with Edition TAKK, a publishing company associated with Sony/ATV Music Publishing Germany. With a tour in winter 2007 the EP Fauler Zauber Dunkelherz was promoted. After that drummer Sven Wasel was replaced by Bodo Stricker.

In May 2008, the band signed a contract with Nuclear Blast. Their label debut Zombieactionhauptquartier contained 13 songs. It was produced by Eike Freese in Hamburg and was published on 28 November 2008. The album features a song "Porn from Spain" with K.I.Z rapping as guest singers.

In March 2010, the band uploaded their third album Videodrom to their Myspace page. It was released on 3 April 2010 and entered the German Media Control Charts at No. 31. The album is inspired by David Cronenberg's film Videodrome.

Their album Blitzkreuz, produced by Colin Richardson, was released in June 2012. A video for the first single "Blitzkreuz" has been released on 12 April. The album contains "Porn from Spain 2", this time additionally to K.I.Z with Mille from Kreator and Sebastian Madsen from Madsen.

With their album Man spricht Deutsch they released an album consisting only of cover versions in January 2013.

In 2015, a new album called Wir sind Angst, this time exclusively with own songs, was released. It contains a song named Dunkelherz, which points back to the 2007 tour.

It was followed by Fandigo, which introduced a change of style. The newer songs contain more synthesized and melodic parts than older ones, the songs became slightly softer whilst maintaining hard riffs.

In succession to Man spricht Deutsch, Callejon released Hartgeld im Club in 2019. It mainly consists of covers of German rap music, although some own songs and features are included. It also contains a third "Porn from Spain"-Song featuring Ice-T and K.I.Z as well.

In May 2020, the band announced a new album entitled "Metropolis", which was released on 28 August 2020. The album was stated to be inspired by Fritz Lang's film of the same name. The first song of the album, also of the same name, was released three months prior on 29 May 2020. Singer BastiBasti directed the accompanying music video. On 31 July, a second single was released titled "Gottficker" with accompanying music video also directed by BastiBasti.

Artwork 
Singer Bastian "BastiBasti" Sobtzick creates all cover artwork of the band himself. He has also designed artwork for releases by other bands such as Iconoclast by Heaven Shall Burn, Say Hello to Tragedy by Caliban and others.

Personnel 
Current members
 Bastian "BastiBasti" Sobtzick – vocals (2002–present)
 Bernhard Horn – guitar (2002–present)
 Christoph "Kotsche" Koterzina– guitar (2011–present)
 Thorsten Becker– bass (2006–present)
 Max "Kotze" Kotzmann – drums (2010–present)

Former members
 Frank Walther – bass
 Simon Vohberger – bass
 Stefan Vohberger – guitar (–2007)
 Sebastian Gallinat (died 2010) – bass
 Sven Wasel – drums (–2007)
 Thomas Buschhausen – guitar

Discography 

Studio albums

EPs

Singles
 2008: Zombiefied / Porn from Spain
 2009: Phantomschmerz
 2010: Sommer, Liebe, Kokain
 2011: Wherever I May Roam
 2012: Feindliche Übernahme
 2012: Porn from Spain 2
 2012: Kind im Nebel
 2014: Dunkelherz
 2017: Utopia
 2017: Monroe
 2017: Noch einmal
 2017: Hölle Stufe 4
 2018: Urlaub fürs Gehirn
 2018: Palmen aus Plastik
 2018: Von Party zu Party
 2018: Was du Liebe nennst
 2018: Porn from Spain 3
 2020: Metropolis
 2020: Gottficker

Demo albums
 2003: Demo 2003

Live albums
 2015: Live in Köln

References

External links 

 
 
 
 
 

German metalcore musical groups
Musical groups established in 2002